The concept of multicultural and diversity management encompasses acceptance and respect, recognition and valuing of individual differences. Diversity is defined as differences between people, that can include dimensions of race, ethnicity, gender, sexual orientation, socioeconomic status, age, physical abilities, religious beliefs, political beliefs, or other ideologies. Multiculturalism refers to the existence of linguistically, culturally and ethnically diverse segments in an organisation.

Ongoing globalization, increasing scale of migration, demographic changes, emerging markets and technology evolution lead to continuous change of the labor environment of contemporary organisations. The necessity of managing diversity and multiculturalism goes far beyond human resource management. Organisations can benefit from it with an increased level of innovation, improved employee engagement, better customer relationships and satisfaction, increases in operating profit and market share, and by achieving competitive advantage in the market.

Diversity management is defined as, "the strategic alignment of workforce heterogeneity to include and value each employee equally on the basis of their diverse characteristics, and to leverage organisational diversity to enhance organisational justice and achieve better business outcomes." This has a strong focus on policies and programs that allows a company to fit people into an organisation. It is centered on surface-level differences and integration that centers on the company-specific culture. Typically, the company that uses multicultural and diversity management does not focus on minimizing the challenges within the cultures; rather they attract various employees and find methods to assimilate them into the company culture.

Diversity management can be described using the ethic model where culture is learned from an outsider's perspective through surface level observations. It focuses on creating module procedures and policies to assimilate new workers into the content company's culture of origin, which does not support the integrations  of individual skills and offerings.

History of diversity management 
Diversity management should be understood as a historically situated concept. Diversity management as a concept appeared and gained momentum in the US in the mid-1980s. At a time when President Ronald Reagan threatened to dismantle equality and affirmative action laws in the US in the 1980s, equality and affirmative action professionals employed by US firms along with equality consultants, engaged in establishing the argument that a diverse workforce should be seen as a competitive advantage rather than just as a legal constraint. Basically, their message was, do not promote diversity because it is a legal mandate, but because it is good for business (Kelly and Dobbin, 1998). From then on, researchers started to test a number of hypotheses on the business benefits of diversity and of diversity management, known as the business case of diversity.

The presence of multicultural and diversity management in the workplace has been depicted as the existence of conceptual and operational policies and programs within the organizations that ensure that the various groups that exists in the societal spectrum are able to effectively participate in the various levels that exists in the organizations.

Research
At an aggregate level, Alessina, Harnoss, and Rapoport (2013) have shown that birth country diversity of the labor force positively impacts a nation's long term productivity and income. Firm-level research has provided conditional support to the proposal that workforce diversity per se brings business benefits with it. In short, whether diversity pays off or not depends on environmental factors, internal or external to the firm. Dwyer, Richard & Chadwyck (2003) found that the effects of gender diversity at the management level are conditional on the firm's strategic orientation, the organizational culture and the multivariate interaction among these variables. Schäffner, Gebert, Schöler, & Kirch (2006) found that if the firm's culture incorporates the normative assumption or belief that diversity is an opportunity, then age diversity becomes a predictor of team innovativeness, but not otherwise. Kearney & Gebert (2006) found that diversity in age, nationality, and functional background, have a positive effect on team innovativeness in a high transformational leadership context, but no effect in a low one. A curvilinear relationship between diversity and performance was identified by Richard, Barnett, Dwyer, & Chadwick (2004). Kochan, Bezrukova, Ely, Jackson, Joshi, Jehn et al. (2003), found few positive or negative direct effects of diversity on performance. In the cases that came under their scrutiny, a number of different aspects of the organizational context or group processes moderated the diversity-performance relationship. Failing to manage diversity properly or developing diversity per se leads to only mixed results (Bell & Berry, 2007; Klein & Harrison, 2007), although Risberg & Corvellec show that approaching diversity management in terms of trying is a way to emphasize the performative dimension of diversity management beyond a reductionist dichotomy between success and failure. Overall research suggests that diversity needs to be properly managed if any business benefits are to be reaped. If properly managed under the right conditions, diversity likely will hold its business promises. Given this conditional nature, the topic remains open to debate and further research.

Connection to human rights 

Each organisation in each sector has an impact and responsibility on human rights. Historically it has been held that norms of human rights apply only to the activities of states and governments, and not to the private sector. Human rights refer to economical, social and ecological aspects of organisations' activities.
The negative effects on different aspect of human rights come from discrimination, sexual harassment, rape, torture, poverty, violation of freedom of association and creating trade unions, health and safety, freedom of expression, privacy, food and water, education and living conditions.
A corporate strategy based on fair diversity management fulfills the commitment to respecting human rights, as is based on support to equal opportunities, social justice, mutual respect and dignity recognition for all people.

Pre-requisites for diversity management

Two diversity dimensions are to be present in an organization. Inherent diversity is a set of traits a person is born with, e.g. gender, ethnicity and sexual orientation. Acquired diversity involves the traits a person gains from experience, e.g. working in foreign country enabling understanding of cultural differences, gender smarts from varied gender groups cooperation, etc. An organization's leadership team should exhibit at least three inherent and three acquired diversity traits to be able to comprehend the needs and challenges the diversity groups are facing.
An organizational culture should be supporting all employees to feel free to contribute their ideas: ensuring that everyone is heard, making it safe to propose new ideas, sharing credit for success, delegating decision making, providing constructive feedback and acting on the feedback received from the organization.

Impact on innovation, market shares and profitability

Multiple and varied voices have a wide range of experience, which can help generate new ideas about organization's products and practices. According to Forbes Insights, diversity is a key driver of innovation. In the opinion of the majority of senior executives diversity is crucial to encouraging different perspectives and ideas that foster innovation.

According to the study conducted by HBR, the companies with two-dimensional diversity in leadership team out-perform their competitors, and are 45% likelier to report that their company's market share grew over previous year. They are also 70% likelier to report that their company captured a new market.

The study on financial results prove that companies with high gender diversity rates in their executive teams were 21% more likely to have above average profitability than companies with lower diversity rate. Top multicultural diverse companies were 33% more likely to outperform on profitability.

A diverse and inclusive workforce can also help to ensure that an organization is respectful of their clients' cultures.

Leadership commitment 

It is clear for most corporate leaders, that if they want to acquire and retain talent, build employee engagement, boost innovation and improve business performance, the diversity should be incorporated. Launching successful diversity programs requires leadership commitment to each initiative, tailored approach creation basing on the organisation's specifics, and metrics for measuring results. The keys to success are treating the diversity program implementation as one of business imperatives and involving employees both in the choice of solutions and in accessing the progress of ongoing measures.
The difficult part here is the fact that often diverse employees at lower levels see multicultural and diversity challenges differently then corporate leadership.
Most of companies homogenous leadership team of primarily white, heterosexual males over 45 years old, who have risen through the ranks in their organisation. They control budgets and decide which diversity programs to choose. Also they don't think that they are biased, yet bias is wired into human nature. This way companies can spend money on diversity initiatives that don't bring the expected results, while according to the study conducted by Boston Consulting Group, more than a third of diverse employees see obstacles to diversity and inclusion in their company, and half of them see bias in their day-to-day work experience.

Leadership commitment actions:

- Compelling CEO vision on diversity

- Diversity program including organisational change going beyond recruitment process, focusing on diversity improvement in workforce and leadership team. It should be tailored for specific organisational culture and actively involving diverse workforce to analysis, preparation and assessment of the progress.

- Work with diverse mentees to understand their challenges and demonstrate own commitment to change.

- Setting strategic goals addressing organisation's diversity challenges.

- Establishing and tracking metrics for recruitment, employee retention, advancement, representation, pay, etc.

Effective organisational initiatives for diversity groups 

The survey published by BCG in 2019 reveals the diversity management initiatives that are considered to be the most effective:

1. Anti-discrimination policies.

2. Trainings to mitigate biases.

3. Removing bias from evaluation and promotion decisions.

Initiatives highly ranked by female employees:

Showing a viable path forward:

- visible role models

Providing tools that help successful balance career and family responsibilities:

- flexible working time

- parental leave

- child care

- appropriate health care

Initiatives highly ranked by employees of colour:

Recruiting a diverse workforce:

- blind screening

- diverse interview panels

Advancing employees of colour:

- bias-free day-to-day experience

- formal sponsorship of individuals; individual action plans

Initiatives highly ranked by LGBTQ employees:

Mainstreaming the LGBTQ experience:

- participating in external events and rankings

- appropriate health care

Removing bias:

- bias-free day-to-day experience

- structural interventions

Сontroversion 

Research indicates that attempts to promote diversity can provoke defensive responses: One study showed that even incidental allusions to diversity during interviews promoted defensive reactions in White male applicants. Indeed, after diversity was mentioned, their performance during the interview deteriorated and their physiological arousal increased.

To offset this problem, some scholars recommend that managers attempt to promote openness to diversity indirectly rather than explicitly. One research study, for example, indicated that employees who are primarily motivated to develop their expertise gradually, rather than outperform their colleagues now, are more receptive to diverse values, ideologies, and demographics. Therefore, performance management systems that inspire employees to develop their skills and capabilities may be more effective than diversity training.

Opinions of business leaders on multicultural and diversity management 

- Gender diversity is essential. It is beyond a moral obligation - it's a business imperative and differentiator. (Denis Machuel, Chief Executive Officer, Sodexo 2018)

- A diverse mix of voices leads to better discussions, decisions and outcomes for everyone. (Sundar Pichai, CEO of Google)

- Teams with a male-female ratio between 40 and 60 percent produce results that are more sustained and predictable than those of unbalanced teams (Michel Landel, McKinsey & Company, 2017)

- Addressing barriers to gender equality is not just the right thing to do, it's also vital for our future growth. We at Unilever consider the respect and promotion of women's rights and the advancement of women's economic inclusion both a human right as well as a business priority (Paul Polman, CEO of Unilever, 2017)

- Diversity strengthens our innovative capacity, unleashes the potential of Siemens' employees and thereby directly contributes to our business success. (Janina Kugiel, Siemens).

- 45% of 850+ executives surveyed across several countries and industries considered global diversity a strategic advantage (Boston Consulting Group, 2022).

References

Sources
 Elwira Gross-Gołacka. Zarządzanie różnorodnością. Warsaw: Difin, 2018.
 DigitalBCG Publications & Reports. https://www.bcg.com/digital-bcg/insights.aspx
 McKinsey&Company. Delivering through Diversity. Diversity and financial performance in 2017. https://www.mckinsey.com/~/media/mckinsey/business%20functions/organization/our%20insights/delivering%20through%20diversity/delivering-through-diversity_full-report.ashx
 Bell, M.P. & Berry, D.P. (2007). Viewing Diversity Through Different Lenses: Avoiding a Few Blind Spots, Academy of Management Perspectives, November
 Dwyer, S., Richard, O., & Chadwyck, K., (2003). Gender diversity in management and firm performance: the influence of growth orientation and organizational culture, Journal of Business Research, December , Vol. 56 Issue 12, p. 1009-1019
 Kearney, E. & Gebert, D. (2006). Does More Diversity Lead to More Innovativeness? An Examination of the Critical Role of Leadership, IFSAM VIIIth World Congress, Track 16, Berlin, 28-30 Sept.
 Kelly, E. & Dobbin, F. (1998). 'How Affirmative Action Became Diversity Management: Employer Response to Anti-discrimination Law, 1961-1996', American Behavioral Scientist 41(7): 960–84.
 Klein, K.J. & Harrison, D.A. (2007). On the Diversity of Diversity: Tidy Logic, Messier Realities, Academy of Management Perspectives, November
 Kochan, T., Bezrukova, K., Ely, R., Jackson, S., Joshi, A., Jehn, K., Leonard, J., Levine, D. & Thomas, D. (2003). The effects of diversity on business performance : report of the diversity research network, Human Resource Management, Spring, Vol. 42 Issue 1, p3-21
 Patrick, H. and Kumar, V. (2012). Managing Workplace diversity: Issued and Challenges. SAGE Open, 2(2).
 Richard, O., Barnett, T., Dwyer, S. & Chadwick, K. (2004). Cultural diversity in management, firm performance, and the moderating role of entrepreneurial orientation dimensions, Academy of Management Journal, Vol. 47, No. 2, 255–266
 Risberg, A. & Corvellec, H. (2022) The significance of trying : How organizational members meet the ambiguities of diversity. Gender, Work, and Organization. DOI (open access)
 Schäffner, M., Gebert, D., Schöler, N. & Kirch, J. (2006). Diversity, its risk and chances for team innovativeness, IFSAM VIIIth World Congress, Track 16, Berlin, 28-30 Sept.
 Thomas, R. R. (1990). ‘From affirmative action to affirming diversity', Harvard Business Review, 68, 107-117
 Thomas, D. and Ely R., (1996). ‘Making differences matter', Harvard Business Review, 74(5), 79-90
 CFI Education Inc.
 Harvard Business Review. How Diversity can drive innovation.
 Cedric Herring, "Does Diversity Pay? Racial Composition of Firms and the Business Case for Diversity" (paper presented at the annual meeting of the American Sociological Association, Montreal, Canada, August 11, 2006), accessed May 5, 2009
 Scott E. Page, The Difference: How the Power of Diversity Creates Better Groups, Firms, Schools, and Societies (Princeton, NJ: Princeton University Press, 2007)

Multiculturalism
Gender equality
Human resource management